Chedoara (stylized as CHEDOARA) is the second studio album by the Japanese band Dimlim, released on August 8, 2018. The promotional video for "Vanitas" was released on June 2, 2018 and the promotional video for "Aizou ni Tsuki" on August 1, 2018. Due to great demand and its two-month sell-out, the album was relaunched on December 23, 2018.

Recording 
A demo version of the track "Malformation" was recorded in November 2017, but the band started working seriously on the album in March 2018. The last adjustments were made at the last minute according to an interview with Gekirock.

Critical reception 
Chiaki Fujitani, of Gekirock, said that it is "[...] a work full of ambition and self-confidence, which not only seems alive, but also symbolizes a more expressive power. [...]"

The album peaked at the 194° position on the Oricon charts.

Track listing

Personnel 
 Sho - Singing
 Retsu - Guitar
 Ryuya - Guitar
 Taishi - Bass
 Hiroshi - Drums

Notes

References 

2018 albums
Dimlim albums
Japanese-language albums